Sir David George Hanson (born 5 July 1957) is a British Labour Party politician who served as the Member of Parliament (MP) for Delyn from 1992 to 2019. He held several ministerial offices in the Blair and Brown governments, serving in the Home Office, Ministry of Justice, Wales Office, Northern Ireland Office and Whips' Office. Hanson sat on Ed Miliband's opposition front bench as a Shadow Treasury Minister, and later the Shadow Immigration Minister.

Early life 
Hanson was born in Liverpool, Lancashire to Brian Hanson, a forklift truck driver, and Glenda Hanson, a personnel records clerk, and has a younger sister, Helen. He was educated at Roscoe Primary School in Liverpool, Grange Primary School and Verdin County Comprehensive School in Winsford, Cheshire, and the University of Hull, where he received a BA in 1978 and a CertEd in 1980. Whilst in Hull, he was the vice president of the university students' union and a member of Hull University Labour Club.

He began his career with the Cooperative Society in 1980 as a trainee manager, becoming a manager in Plymouth in 1981. He worked for the Spastics Society, now Scope, from 1982 until 1989, when he was appointed as a director at the Society for the Prevention of Solvent Abuse.

Political career
Hanson was elected as a councillor to the Vale Royal Borough Council in 1983, serving as the Labour group and council leader from 1989 until 1991, when he stood down to stand in Delyn at the 1992 general election. He was also elected as a councillor to the Northwich Town Council in 1987 and also led the Labour group there in 1989 for a year, leaving the Town Council in 1991.

He unsuccessfully contested Eddisbury at the 1983 general election where he was defeated by the sitting Conservative MP Alastair Goodlad by some 14,846 votes. In 1984 he contested the West Cheshire seat for the European Parliament but was again unsuccessful. He contested Delyn in Wales at the 1987 general election but was defeated by the Tory Keith Raffan by 1,224 votes. It proved third time lucky for Hanson when he was elected to the House of Commons at the 1992 general election when, following Raffan's retirement, he won the Clwyd seat at Delyn by 2,039. He made his maiden speech on 6 May 1992.

In parliament he was a member of the Welsh affairs select committee from 1992 until he joined the public accounts committee in 1996. He became the Parliamentary Private Secretary PPS to the Chief Secretary to the Treasury Alistair Darling in 1997 and became a member of the Tony Blair government in his first reshuffle in 1998 when he was appointed as an Assistant Government Whip. He was promoted in 1999 on his appointment as the Parliamentary Under-Secretary of State at the Wales Office. Following the 2001 general election he became the PPS to Prime Minister Tony Blair. He served as the Minister of State at the Northern Ireland Office from the 2005 general election until 8 May 2007, when the Northern Ireland Assembly was restored after its period of suspension. He was the Minister of State at the new Ministry of Justice from 9 May 2007 until 8 June 2009. On 21 February 2007, his appointment to the Privy Council was announced.

He was Minister of State for Security, Counter-Terrorism, Crime and Policing at the Home Office from 8 June 2009 until the 2010 general election. He then shadowed that role, and after the Labour leadership election was appointed Shadow Treasury Minister.

In September 2011 he contributed to the book What Next for Labour? Ideas for a new Generation, his piece was entitled "What Awaits Labour in 2015?"

Hanson lost his seat in the 2019 general election to Rob Roberts, the Conservative Party candidate. He was knighted in the 2020 Birthday Honours for political service.

Personal life 
He married Margaret Rose Mitchell, who has also been a politician in Vale Royal. She was narrowly defeated at the 1999 Eddisbury by-election, the same constituency he himself had fought in 1983. They have a son and three daughters.

References

External links
 David Hanson official constituency website
 David Hanson MP Welsh Labour Party profile
 Minister of State for Justice archived government profile

1957 births
Living people
Knights Bachelor
Politicians awarded knighthoods
Welsh Labour Party MPs
Northern Ireland Office junior ministers
Members of the Privy Council of the United Kingdom
People from Winsford
Alumni of the University of Hull
Politicians from Liverpool
Labour Friends of Israel
Parliamentary Private Secretaries to the Prime Minister
UK MPs 1992–1997
UK MPs 1997–2001
UK MPs 2001–2005
UK MPs 2005–2010
UK MPs 2010–2015
UK MPs 2015–2017
UK MPs 2017–2019
Welsh republicans